Louise of Saxe-Gotha-Altenburg (Louise Dorothea Pauline Charlotte Fredericka Auguste; 21 December 1800 – 30 August 1831) was the wife of Ernst I, Duke of Saxe-Coburg and Gotha and the mother of Duke Ernst II and Prince Albert, husband of Queen Victoria. She was the paternal grandmother of King Edward VII of the United Kingdom.

Family
Princess Louise was the only daughter of Augustus, Duke of Saxe-Gotha-Altenburg and his first wife Louise Charlotte of Mecklenburg-Schwerin, daughter of Frederick Francis I, Grand Duke of Mecklenburg-Schwerin and Princess Louise of Saxe-Gotha-Altenburg (her namesake).

Marriage and issue

On 31 July 1817 in Gotha, 16-year-old Louise married her 33-year-old kinsman Ernst III, Duke of Saxe-Coburg-Saalfeld, (later Ernst I, Duke of Saxe-Coburg and Gotha), after he failed to win the hand of a Russian grand duchess. Louise was considered "young, clever, and beautiful".

They had two children: Ernst, who inherited his father's lands and titles, and Albert, who was later the husband of Queen Victoria.

The marriage was unhappy because of Ernst's infidelities and the couple separated in 1824. Sankt Wendel, in the Principality of Lichtenberg, was assigned as her new residence (it was an exclave of Saxe-Coburg und Gotha; see Sotnick on this period), and Louise was forced to leave her two sons behind. Biographer Lytton Strachey noted in 1921: "The ducal court was not noted for the strictness of its morals; the Duke was a man of gallantry, and it was rumored that the Duchess followed her husband's example. There were scandals: one of the Court Chamberlains, a charming and cultivated man of Jewish extraction, was talked of; at last there was a separation, followed by a divorce."

Post-divorce

On 31 March 1826 their marriage was officially dissolved. Seven months later, on 18 October 1826, Louise secretly married in St. Wendel  her former lover, the Baron Alexander von Hanstein (later created Count of Pölzig and Beiersdorf). In her previous marriage, she had taken great interest in the social life of the principality and was revered as its Landesmutter (literally, "mother of the region"). Nevertheless, this happy life ended in February 1831, when her secret marriage to von Hanstein was discovered and she lost her children permanently.

Louise died of cancer on 30 August 1831, when she was only 30 years old. Years after her death, Queen Victoria described Louise in an 1864 memorandum: "The princess is described as having been very handsome, though very small; fair, with blue eyes; and Prince Albert is said to have been extremely like her". Louise was reinterred from her initial burial site at Morizkirche to the ducal mausoleum at  after it had been completed in 1859.

Ancestry

References

Sources

External links
 

|-

Princesses of Saxe-Gotha-Altenburg
1800 births
1831 deaths
Burials at the Ducal Family Mausoleum, Glockenburg Cemetery, Coburg
Duchesses of Saxe-Coburg-Saalfeld
People from Gotha (town)
Deaths from cancer in France
Daughters of monarchs
Remarried royal consorts